Cantil (Spanish for "Stone Cliff") is an unincorporated community in Kern County, California.  It is in the Fremont Valley of the western Mojave Desert.

Geography
It is located on California State Route 14, between Mojave and Red Rock Canyon.

Its zip code is 93519, and it uses area codes 442 and 760.

The Red Rock Elementary School and Red Rock Community Day School are in Cantil. Both help students who were not successful in the regular school system.

History
Cantil was founded as a station on the Nevada and California Railroad in 1908 or 1909 when the line was extended from Owens Lake to Mojave. The name is Spanish for "stone cliff" or "steep rock", and is one of a series of "C" names chosen for this section of the line including Cambio, Cinco, and Ceneda.  The first post office opened in 1916.

Cantil is near the home of the Honda Proving Center of California (HPCC), a test track used for testing new car models and motorcycles. Honda closed the test facility in April 2010 and put it up for sale; on December 8, 2015, the company announced that they would renovate and expand the HPCC, with some new vehicle test road enhancements and reopen the facility in April 2016.

On October 31, 2014, the Virgin Galactic SpaceShipTwo VSS Enterprise crashed in the Mojave Desert near Cantil, killing one of the two pilots.

Climate
According to the Köppen Climate Classification system, Cantil has a cold desert climates, abbreviated "BWk" on climate maps. Average rainfall is just .

References

Unincorporated communities in Kern County, California
Populated places in the Mojave Desert
Populated places established in 1908
1908 establishments in California
Unincorporated communities in California